Starboy is the third studio album by Canadian singer the Weeknd, released on November 25, 2016, through XO and Republic Records. It features guest appearances from Daft Punk, Lana Del Rey, Kendrick Lamar, and Future. As the album's executive producers, the Weeknd and Doc McKinney enlisted a variety of producers such as Diplo, Cashmere Cat, Metro Boomin, Frank Dukes, and Labrinth, among others. 

Starboy was supported by seven singles, including the US Billboard Hot 100 number-ones "Starboy" and "Die for You", and the top-five single "I Feel It Coming". It received generally favorable reviews from critics and debuted at number one on the US Billboard 200 with 348,000 album-equivalent units (209,000 of which were pure sales), becoming the Weeknd's second consecutive number-one album. It also debuted at number one on Billboards Canadian Albums Chart. Starboy won Best Urban Contemporary Album at the 60th Annual Grammy Awards in 2018, marking the Weeknd's second win in that category. As of April 2022, the album is certified four-times platinum by the Recording Industry Association of America (RIAA). In 2023, the Weeknd released a deluxe version that contained three additional remixes.

Background 
After the commercial success of his previous album Beauty Behind the Madness (2015), the Weeknd hinted at the release of his third studio album on March 12, 2016, with an Instagram post calling it the next "chapter" to his music. On August 24, the executive vice president of Republic Records Wendy Goldstein confirmed during an interview with Billboard that the Weeknd would be collaborating with French electronic duo Daft Punk. On September 7, the Weeknd revealed during an interview with VMan that the album was in production and was influenced by Prince, the Smiths, Talking Heads and Bad Brains. He later revealed the album's overall theme and additional influences during his own interview with Billboard: 

The Weeknd formally announced his third studio album on September 21, by sharing its title and release date of November 25. The album cover was photographed and designed by Nabil Elderkin, and its CD booklet features eleven portraits of the Weeknd shot by Elderkin.

Composition 
Primarily a R&B, pop and trap record, Starboy incorporates elements of new wave, disco, dance-punk, electro-rock, electropop, electro-dance, 2-step, and disco-house. Lyrical themes include celebrity extravagance, braggadocio, romance and materialism.

Promotion

Singles 
On September 21, 2016, the album's lead single, "Starboy", was released digitally on music stores and streaming services. The song features guest appearances from French electronic duo Daft Punk. The music video for the song premiered on September 28. The song peaked at number one on the US Billboard Hot 100.

"I Feel It Coming" was serviced to British contemporary hit radio on November 24, 2016, and later to rhythmic contemporary radio on December 6, 2016, as the album's second single. The song peaked at number four on the Billboard Hot 100.

"Party Monster" was released to urban contemporary radio on December 6, 2016, as the album's third single. The song peaked at number 16 on the Billboard Hot 100.

"Reminder" was released to rhythmic contemporary radio on May 9, 2017, as the album's fourth single in the United States. The song peaked at number 31 on the Billboard Hot 100.

"Rockin' was released to contemporary hit radio in France on May 9, 2017, as the album's fifth international single. The song peaked at number 44 on the Billboard Hot 100.

"Die for You" was released to rhythmic contemporary radio on September 19, 2017, as the album's fifth single in the United States. The song peaked at number 43 on the Billboard Hot 100 during its original run and achieved a new peak of number six in January 2023. Following a remix with Ariana Grande, the song peaked at number one on the Billboard Hot 100 in March 2023.

"Secrets" was released to radio in Italy on November 10, 2017, as the album's seventh and final international single. The song peaked at number 47 on the Billboard Hot 100.

Performances
The Weeknd was a musical guest on the season 42 season premiere of Saturday Night Live. He promoted the album by performing both "Starboy" and "False Alarm" and starred in a brief cameo on the "Weeknd Update" sketch, where he acknowledged his new haircut. On November 20, 2016, the Weeknd sang "Starboy" at the 2016 American Music Awards. Four days later, the Weeknd appeared on The Tonight Show Starring Jimmy Fallon to perform both "I Feel It Coming" and "Starboy". On December 6, he performed at the 2016 Victoria's Secret Fashion Show on CBS. On February 12, 2017, the Weeknd and Daft Punk performed at the 2017 Grammy Awards.

On November 25, 2016, all of the album's tracks played throughout the Weeknd's interview with Zane Lowe for Beats 1.

Short film
On November 23, 2016, the Weeknd released a 12-minute-long short film in promotion of the album, directed by Grant Singer, who also directed the "Starboy" music video. Named Mania (stylized as M A N I A), it features the songs such as "All I Know" featuring Future, "Sidewalks" featuring Kendrick Lamar, "Secrets", "Die for You", "Party Monster" and "I Feel It Coming" featuring Daft Punk. It stars French model Anais Mali as the female protagonist.

Critical reception 

Starboy was met with generally favorable reviews. At Metacritic, which assigns a normalized rating out of 100 to reviews from professional publications, the album received an average score of 67, based on 25 reviews. Aggregator AnyDecentMusic? gave it 6.4 out of 10, based on their assessment of the critical consensus.

Annie Zaleski of The A.V. Club praised the album saying, "The record is a few songs too long, and it loses steam as it progresses. But such imperfections are par for the course: He'd rather express everything he's feeling than put forth an airbrushed or idealized version of himself. In that sense, Starboy is one of the most confident releases of the year, one bold enough to reveal the cracks in The Weeknd's façade for the sake of resonant art". Michael Madden of Consequence said, "It would help if more of the album were idiosyncratic that way, but as is, Starboy is still the sound of Tesfaye knowing he has what it takes to be a major figure in pop music for a very long time". Neil McCormick of The Daily Telegraph gave the album a positive review stating, "What is surprising is how seamless and integrated the sound is—a really luxurious, supple groove of sparkling electronica and sinuous, melodic vocals". Nolan Feeney of Entertainment Weekly wrote: "While musicians writing about coping with newfound celebrity is one of pop's oldest tropes, the Weeknd avoids the usual clichés with observations and anecdotes that feel specific and genuine." Ryan B. Patrick of Exclaim! saying "Those wishing for a return to the Trilogy days will have to bit a tad longer; across 18 tracks, the Weeknd proves he's ready for primetime here, but there's still a sense of feeling out the new parameters". Mehan Jayasuriya of Pitchfork said, "Starboy, by way of contrast [to Trilogy], feels more like an opportunistic compilation of B-sides than an album. Who is the Weeknd? At this point, even the man behind the curtain might not know".

In a mixed review, AllMusic's Andy Kellman stated: "The productions—the majority of which involve Doc McKinney and/or Cirkut, low-lighted by maneater dance-punk dud "False Alarm"—are roughly as variable in style as they are in quality. When pared down to its ten best songs, Starboy sounds like Tesfaye's most accomplished work." Alexis Petridis of The Guardian said, "There are things worth hearing on Starboy. It seems to capture an artist in a slightly awkward state of flux, unsure whether to cravenly embrace the kind of pop stardom that gets you on the shortlist for the Nickelodeon Kids' Choice awards or throw caution to the wind and do something more interesting artistically. Starboy hedges its bets and tries to do both. You can see why, but it makes for a curiously uneven album". In another mixed review, Rolling Stones Mosi Reeves stated: "Despite an overlong hour-plus runtime and surplus of filler, Starboy does have highlights. ... But for longtime fans that believe the Weeknd is one of the major R&B artists of the decade, Starboy will ultimately seem like a disappointment."

Year-end lists

Industry awards

Commercial performance 
In the United States, Starboy debuted at number one on the Billboard 200 with 348,000 album-equivalent units, calculated from 209,000 pure album sales and 175.2 million on-demand streams. It marked the Weeknd's second consecutive number-one album and the third-largest debut sales week of 2016. At the time, Starboy had the second-largest streaming week for an album ever behind Drake's Views. All 18 songs from the album charted on the Billboard Hot 100. It marked the second-best total simultaneous Hot 100 entries at the time, after Drake charted 20 songs at the same time in May 2016. Starboy was ranked as the third most popular album of 2017 on the Billboard 200.

On April 5, 2022, Starboy was certified four-times platinum by the Recording Industry Association of America (RIAA) for combined sales and streams in excess of four million units in the United States.

Track listing 

Notes
 signifies a co-producer
 signifies a remix producer
 "Party Monster" features background vocals by Lana Del Rey
 "Rockin' features additional vocals by Kazue Lika Tatsushima
 "Sidewalks" features additional vocals by Daniel Wilson
 "Six Feet Under" features additional vocals by Future

Sample credits
 "Secrets" contains a portion of "Pale Shelter", written by Roland Orzabal; and embodies a portion of "Talking in Your Sleep", written by Coz Canler, Jimmy Marinos, Wally Palamarchuk, Mike Skill and Peter Solley.

Personnel
Adapted from the album's liner notes.

 Cory Bice – assistant engineer 
 Ben Billions – producer , engineer 
 Benny Blanco – producer 
 Ryland Blackinton – guitar 
 Bobby Raps – producer 
 Cashmere Cat – producer , co-producer , additional vocals 
 Simon Christianson – additional guitar 
 Cirkut – co-producer , engineer , producer 
 Tom Coyne – mastering 
 Lana Del Rey – backing vocals , featured artist 
 Frank Dukes – producer 
 Daft Punk – producers, featured artist 
 Diplo – producer 
 Nathan East – bass 
 Adrian Eccleston – acoustic guitar 
 Robin Florent – assistant mix engineer 
 Future – additional vocals , featured artist 
 Chris Galland – mix engineer 
 Şerban Ghenea – mixing 
 John Hanes – mix engineer 
 Sam Holland – engineer 
 Jeff Jackson – assistant mix engineer 
 Paul Jackson Jr. – guitar 
 Labrinth – producer 
 Florian Lagatta – engineer 
 Kendrick Lamar – featured artist 
 Jeremy Lertola – assistant engineer ; handclaps 
 Mano – co-producer , producer 
 Manny Marroquin – mixing 
 Max Martin – producer ; guitar 
 Doc McKinney – executive producer, co-producer , engineer , producer 
 Aya Merrill – mastering 
 Raphael Mesquita – engineer 
 Metro Boomin – producer 
 Ali Shaheed Muhammad – producer 
 Jake One – producer 
 Noah "Mailbox" Passovoy – engineer 
 Ali Payami – producer 
 Prince 85 – co-producer 
 JR Robinson – drums 
 David Schwerkolt – engineer 
 Josh Smith – engineer 
 Peter Svensson – guitar 
 Swish – producer 
 Kazue Lika Tatsushima – additional vocals 
 The Weeknd – executive producer, co-producer , producer 
 Dylan Wiggins – keyboards ; bass ; drums ; synth bass 
 Daniel Wilson – additional vocals, additional producer

Charts

Weekly charts

Year-end charts

Decade-end charts

Certifications

Release history

References

Footnotes

Citations

External links

2016 albums
Albums produced by Cirkut
Albums produced by Jake One
Albums produced by Guy-Manuel de Homem-Christo
Albums produced by Thomas Bangalter
Albums produced by Metro Boomin
Albums produced by Frank Dukes
Albums produced by Labrinth
Albums produced by Max Martin
Albums produced by Diplo
Albums produced by Cashmere Cat
Republic Records albums
The Weeknd albums
Juno Award for R&B/Soul Recording of the Year recordings
Grammy Award for Best Urban Contemporary Album
Albums produced by the Weeknd
Trap music albums